Raymond Jerold "Robert" Bowman (April 2, 1924 – April 18, 1945) was an American infantryman who fought in World War II.

Early life, military service, and death 
Raymond Jerold Bowman was born in Rochester, New York on April 2, 1924, the fifth of seven children to George and Florence Rebecca (née Ward) Bowman. After graduating high school, Bowman was drafted into the United States Army on June 21, 1943; Bowman was unmarried, and had no children. He was assigned to Company D of the 23rd Infantry Regiment of the 2nd Infantry Division on July 5, 1943, where he later qualified as a machine gunner. In January 1944, he was sent overseas to the United Kingdom in preparation for Operation Overlord. Bowman served in France, where he was wounded in action on August 3, 1944, and later in Belgium and Germany. He reached the rank of Private first class during his service.

On April 18, 1945, in Leipzig, Germany, while Bowman and other troops were fighting to secure a bridge from a position inside an apartment building, Bowman was shot and killed by a German sniper while reloading his M1917 Browning machine gun. Nearby photographer Robert Capa captured images of the fight, Bowman's death, and the immediate aftermath, which gained fame in Life magazine with the caption "The picture of the last man to die." The Life magazine article did not identify the soldiers in the photographs by name, although Bowman's family recognized him by the small pin (which bore his initials) that he always wore on his collar.

Honors and awards 
Bowman received many honors for his service, including the Bronze Star Medal, an Army Good Conduct Medal, and two Purple Hearts.

In July 2015, the city of Leipzig, Germany voted to name the street in front of the apartment building where Bowman was killed "Bowmanstraße" after him (previously a part of Jahnallee). The renaming took place on April 17, 2016. The apartment building now contains a small memorial with Capa's photographs and information about Bowman.

References

External links 
 
 
 

1924 births
1945 deaths
United States Army personnel killed in World War II
Military personnel from Rochester, New York
People notable for being the subject of a specific photograph
United States Army soldiers
Deaths by firearm in Germany